"Winter Bells" is Mai Kuraki's 11th single, released on January 17, 2002

Usage in media
 "Detective Conan" anime series opening theme

Track listing

Charts

Oricon Sales Chart

References

2002 singles
2002 songs
Mai Kuraki songs
Giza Studio singles
Case Closed songs
Oricon Weekly number-one singles
Songs written by Mai Kuraki
Songs with music by Akihito Tokunaga
Song recordings produced by Daiko Nagato